Vagin or Vaguine is a Russian masculine surname originating from the word vaga meaning lazy person, its feminine counterpart is Vagina. The surname may refer to the following notable people:

 Merkury Vagin (died 1712), Russian Arctic explorer
 Vladimir Vagin (illustrator), Soviet and American illustrator
 Vladimir Vagin (footballer) (born 1982), Russian football player

References

Russian-language surnames